Se spominjaš Afrike? (Do You Remember Africa?) is a novel by Slovenian author Zdenka Žebre. It was first published in 2003.

See also
List of Slovenian novels

References

Slovenian novels
2003 novels